During the Last Glacial Maximum, the mammoth steppe, also known as steppe-tundra, was the Earth's most extensive biome. It spanned from Spain eastward across Eurasia to Canada and from the arctic islands southward to China. The mammoth steppe was cold and dry. The vegetation was dominated by palatable high-productivity grasses, herbs and willow shrubs. The animal biomass was dominated by reindeer, bison, horses, and woolly mammoth. This ecosystem covered wide areas of the northern part of the globe, thrived for approximately 100,000 years without major changes, but then diminished to small regions around 12,000 years ago.

Naming 
At the end of the 19th century, Alfred Nehring (1890) and Jan Czerski (Iwan Dementjewitsch Chersky, 1891) proposed that during the last glacial period a major part of northern Europe had been populated by large herbivores and that a steppe climate had prevailed there. In 1982, the scientist R. Dale Guthrie coined the term "mammoth steppe" for this paleoregion.

Origin 
The last glacial period, commonly referred to as the 'Ice Age', spanned from 126,000 YBP–11,700 YBP and was the most recent glacial period within the current ice age which occurred during the last years of the Pleistocene epoch. This arctic environment was very cold and dry and probably dusty, resembling mountaintop environments (alpine tundra), and was very different from today's swampy tundra. It reached its peak during the last glacial maximum, when ice sheets commenced advancing from 33,000 years BP and reached their maximum positions 26,500 years BP. Deglaciation commenced in the Northern Hemisphere approximately 19,000 years BP, and in Antarctica approximately 14,500 years BP, which is consistent with evidence that it was the primary source for an abrupt rise in the sea level at that time.

During the peak of the last glacial maximum, a vast mammoth steppe stretched from the Iberian Peninsula across Eurasia and over the Bering land bridge into Alaska and the Yukon where it was stopped by the Wisconsin glaciation. This land bridge existed because more of the planet's water was locked up in ice than now, hence sea levels were lower. When the sea levels began to rise this bridge was inundated around 11,000 years BP.

During glacial periods, there is clear evidence for intense aridity due to water being held in glaciers and their associated effects on climate. The mammoth steppe was like a huge 'inner court' that was surrounded on all sides by moisture-blocking features: massive continental glaciers, high mountains, and frozen seas. These kept rainfall low and created more days with clear skies than are seen today, which increased evaporation in the summer leading to aridity, and radiation of warmth from the ground into the night sky in winter leading to cold. This is thought to have been caused by seven factors:

The driving force for the core Asian steppe was an enormous and stable high-pressure system north of the Tibetan Plateau.
Deflection of the larger portion of the Gulf Stream southward, past southern Spain onto the coast of Africa, reduced temperatures (hence moisture and cloud cover) that the North Atlantic Current brings to Western Europe.
Growth of the Scandinavian ice sheet created a barrier to North Atlantic moisture.
Icing over of the North Atlantic sea surface with reduced flow of moisture from the east.
The winter (January) storm track seems to have swept across Eurasia on this axis.
Lowered sea levels exposed a large continental shelf to the north and east producing a vast northern plain which increased the size of the continent to the north.
North American glaciers shielded interior Alaska and the Yukon Territory from moisture flow.
These physical barriers to moisture flow created a vast arid basin spanning three continents.

Environment (or biota) 

Animal biomass and plant productivity of the mammoth steppe were similar to today's African savanna. There is no comparison to it today.

Plants 
The paleo-environment changed across time, a proposal that is supported from mammoth dung samples found in northern Yakutia. During Pleniglacial interstadials, alder, birch, and pine trees survived in northern Siberia, however during the Last Glacial Maximum only a treeless steppe vegetation existed. At the onset of the Late Glacial Interstadial (15,000–11,000 BP), global warming resulted in shrub and dwarf birch in northeastern Siberia, which was then colonized by open woodland with birch and spruce during the Younger Dryas (12,900–11,700 YBP). By the Holocene (10,000 YBP), patches of closed larch and pine forests developed. Researchers had previously concluded that the mammoth steppe must have been very unproductive because they assumed that its soils had a very low carbon content; however, these soils (yedoma) were preserved in the permafrost of Siberia and Alaska and are the largest reservoir of organic carbon known. It was a highly productive environment. The vegetation was dominated by palatable high-productivity grasses, herbs and willow shrubs. Herbs were far more widespread than they are today, and were the main food source of the large plant eating mammals.

Animals 

The mammoth steppe was dominated in biomass by reindeer, bison, horse, and the woolly mammoth, and was the center for the evolution of the Pleistocene woolly fauna. Megaloceros, saiga antelope and musk ox also lived on the mammoth steppe (the first one not in the northernmost parts). In the Siberian parts were animals like the argali, Snow sheep and the Mongolian gazelle. Not so far before the last glacial maximum (roughly 40.000 years ago), an extinct paleospecies of argali (Ovis argaloides) lived also in Europe. Notable carnivores found across the whole range of the mammoth steppe included Panthera spelaea, the Wolverine, the wolf Canis lupus and the brown bear Ursus arctos. While the cave hyena was part of mammoth steppe faunas in Europe, it did not extend into the core high latitude north Asian range of the biome. Bird remains are rare because of their fragile structure, but there is some evidence for snowy owl, willow ptarmigan, gyrfalcon, common raven and great bustard. Other bird species are white-tailed eagle and golden eagle. Vultures like griffon vulture and cinereous vulture are not known but they were likely common scavengers on the mammoth steppe, following the large herds and scavenging on dead animals. On Wrangel Island, the remains of woolly mammoth, woolly rhinoceros, horse, bison and musk ox have been found. Reindeer and small animal remains do not preserve, but reindeer excrement has been found in sediment. Small animals on the mammoth steppe were, for example, steppe pika, ground squirrels and alpine marmot. In the most arid regions of the mammoth steppe that were to the south of Central Siberia and Mongolia, woolly rhinoceros were common but woolly mammoths were rare. Reindeer live in the far north of Mongolia today and historically their southern boundary passed through Germany and along the steppes of eastern Europe, indicating they once covered much of the mammoth steppe. 

Mammoths survived on the Taimyr Peninsula until the Holocene. A small population of mammoths survived on St. Paul Island, Alaska, up until 3750 BC, and the small mammoths of Wrangel Island survived until 1650 BC. Bison in Alaska and the Yukon, and horses and muskox in northern Siberia, have survived the loss of the mammoth steppe. One study has proposed that a change of suitable climate caused a significant drop in the mammoth population size, which made them vulnerable to hunting from expanding human populations. The coincidence of both of these impacts in the Holocene most likely set the place and time for the extinction of the woolly mammoth.

Decline of the mammoth steppe 
The mammoth steppe had a cold, dry climate. During the past interglacial warmings, forests of trees and shrubs expanded northward into the mammoth steppe, when northern Siberia, Alaska and the Yukon (Beringia) would have formed a mammoth steppe refugium. When the planet grew colder again, the mammoth steppe expanded. This ecosystem covered wide areas of the northern part of the globe, thrived for approximately 100,000 years without major changes, but then diminished to small regions around 12,000 years ago.

There are two theories about the decline of the mammoth steppe.

Climate change 
The Climatic Hypothesis assumes that the vast mammoth ecosystem could have only existed within a certain range of climatic parameters. At the beginning of the Holocene 10,000 years ago, mossy forests, tundra, lakes and wetlands displaced mammoth steppe. It has been assumed that in contrast to other previous interglacials the cold dry climate switched to a warmer wetter climate that, in turn, caused the disappearance of the grasslands and their dependent megafauna.

The extinct steppe bison (Bison priscus) survived across the northern region of central eastern Siberia until 8000 years ago. A study of the frozen mummy of a steppe bison found in northern Yakutia, Russia indicated that it was a pasture grazer in a habitat that was becoming dominated by shrub and tundra vegetation. Higher temperature and rainfall led to a decrease in its previous habitat during the early Holocene, and this led to population fragmentation followed by extinction.

The mammoth steppe was covered all winter with snow, which reflected sunlight back up into space and thus delayed the spring warming. With no more mammoths left to push trees down to get at their leaves to eat, the area became covered in tall forest sticking up above the snow all winter and catching the early sunlight and thus causing an early spring warming.

In 2017 a study looked at the environmental conditions across Europe, Siberia and the Americas from 25,000 to 10,000 YBP. The study found that prolonged warming events leading to deglaciation and maximum rainfall occurred just before the transformation of the rangelands that supported megaherbivores into widespread wetlands that supported herbivore-resistant plants. The study proposes that moisture-driven environmental change led to the megafaunal extinctions, and that Africa's trans-equatorial position allowed rangeland to continue to exist between the deserts and the central forests; therefore fewer megafauna species became extinct there.

Human predation 
The Ecosystem Hypothesis assumes that the vast mammoth ecosystem extended over a range of many regional climates and was not affected by climate fluctuations. Its highly productive grasslands were maintained by animals trampling any mosses and shrubs, and actively transpiring grasses and herbs dominated. At the beginning of the Holocene the rise in precipitation was accompanied by increased temperature, and so its climatic aridity did not change substantially. As a result of human hunting, the decreasing density of the mammoth ecosystem animals was not enough to stop forest from spreading over the grasslands, leading to an increase in forests, shrubs and mosses with further animal reduction due to loss of feed. The mammoth continued to exist on isolated Wrangel Island until a few thousand years ago, and some of the other megafauna from that time still exist today, which indicates that something other than climate change was responsible for megafaunal extinctions.

Remains of mammoth that had been hunted by humans 45,000 YBP have been found at Yenisei Bay in the central Siberian Arctic. Two other sites in the Maksunuokha River valley to the south of the Shirokostan Peninsula, northeast Siberia, dated between 14,900 and 13,600 years ago showed the remains of mammoth hunting and the production of micro-blades similar to those found in northwest North America, suggesting a cultural connection.

Last remnants 

During the Holocene, the arid-adapted species became extinct or were reduced to minor habitats. Cold and dry conditions similar to the last glacial period are found today in the eastern Altai-Sayan mountains of Central Eurasia, with no significant changes occurring between the cold phase of the Pleistocene and the Holocene. Recent paleo-biome reconstruction and pollen analysis suggest that some present-day Altai-Sayan areas could be considered the closest analogy to the mammoth steppe environment. The environment of this region is considered to have been stable for the past 40,000 years. The Eastern part of the Altai-Sayan region forms a Last Glacial refugium. In both the Last Glacial and modern times, the eastern Altai-Sayan region has supported large herbivore and predator species adapted to the steppe, desert and alpine biomes where these biomes have not been separated by forest belts. None of the surviving Pleistocene mammals live in temperate forest, taiga, or tundra biomes. The areas of Ukok-Sailiugem in the southern Altai Republic, and Khar Us Nuur and Uvs Nuur (Ubsunur Hollow) in western Mongolia, have supported reindeer and saiga antelope since the glacial period.

See also 
Pleistocene megafauna
Pleistocene Park – a project to restore a small part of what once was the mammoth steppe.
Quaternary extinction event

References 

Tundra
Montane grasslands and shrublands
Ecoregions
Ice ages
Last Glacial Maximum
Paleoecology